La Vie Claire is a French chain of health product stores.  It sponsored one of the strongest cycling teams of all time called La Vie Claire with Bernard Hinault. In 1980, it was bought by Bernard Tapie with a 200 million francs turnover (30 million euros) through 250 stores. In 1996, it generated only 10.6 million euros turnover with 120 stores.  It was sold through Crédit Lyonnais (CDR) to Distriborg for 10 million francs.

Footnotes

External links
official website

Retail companies of France